Khe Sanh is the district capital of Hướng Hoá District, Quảng Trị Province, Vietnam, located 63 km west of Đông Hà. 

During the Vietnam War, the Khe Sanh Combat Base was located to the north of the city. The Battle of Khe Sanh took place there. The Khe Sanh Combat Base is a museum where relics of the war are exhibited. Most of the former base is now overgrown by wilderness or coffee and banana plants.

References

Communes of Quảng Trị province
District capitals in Vietnam
Townships in Vietnam